Odice suava is a species of moth of the family Erebidae. It was described by Jacob Hübner in 1813. It is found in southern Europe, Algeria, Turkey and the Middle East.

References

"e09129 Odice suava (Hübner, 1813) - (Noctuidae / Eustrotiinae)". Hantsmoths.

External links

Lepiforum e.V.

Moths described in 1813
Boletobiinae
Moths of Europe
Moths of Asia
Taxa named by Jacob Hübner